Derby is an unincorporated community along the Ohio River in far southern Union Township, Perry County, in the U.S. state of Indiana.  It lies at the intersection of State Roads 66 and 70 above the city of Tell City, the county seat of Perry County.  Its elevation is 453 feet (138 m), and it is located at  (38.0303400, -86.5272018). Although Derby is unincorporated, it has a post office, with the ZIP code of 47525.

History
Derby was platted in 1835. The community was named after Derby, in Ireland. A post office has been in operation at Derby since 1852.

See also
 List of cities and towns along the Ohio River

References

Unincorporated communities in Perry County, Indiana
Indiana populated places on the Ohio River
Unincorporated communities in Indiana